Buondelmonti may refer to:

People
Cristoforo Buondelmonti, Italian monk and traveler
Esau de' Buondelmonti, medieval ruler of Epirus
Giorgio de' Buondelmonti, medieval ruler of Epirus
Giuseppe Maria Buondelmonti, Italian poet, orator and philosopher

Other

Torre dei Buondelmonti, a medieval tower in Florence, Italy
Palazzo Buondelmonti, a palace in Piazza Santa Trinita, Florence, Italy